Kesey's Garage Sale is a collection of essays and other writings by Ken Kesey, published in 1973. The book features the play "Over the Border" which is based on the time Kesey spent hiding in Mexico from drug charges in the United States. It is illustrated by the cartoonist and Merry Prankster Paul Foster, and also includes contributions from Paul Krassner, Neal Cassaday, Allen Ginsberg, Hugh Romney and Arthur Miller. Much of the material had previously appeared elsewhere.

An anonymous reviewer in American Humor writes that it contains "intriguing nuggets of wisdom" on Kesey's views.

References

1973 books
Essay collections
Viking Press books
Works by Ken Kesey